Kim Kye-hoon (born November 12, 1979), better known by his stage name Crown J is a South Korean rapper. He was a cast member in Season 1 of We Got Married from the Chuseok special to episode 41 with Seo In-young as part of the Ant Couple.

Discography

Albums
 One & Only (2006)
 Miss Me?... (2007)

EPs
  Fly Boy (2008)

References

External links
 

1979 births
Living people
South Korean male rappers
South Korean hip hop record producers
South Korean television personalities
Rappers from Seoul